Novosphingobium malaysiense  is a Gram-negative, rod-shaped and non-spore-forming bacterium from the genus Novosphingobium which has been isolated from mangrove soil from the Tanjung Lumpur river in Pahang in Malaysia.

References

External links
Type strain of Novosphingobium malaysiense at BacDive -  the Bacterial Diversity Metadatabase

Bacteria described in 2014
Sphingomonadales